Milan Aleksić (born 13 May 1986) is a Serbian water polo center back who plays for Partizan and the Serbia men's national water polo team. He is a 2016 and 2020 Olympic champion and a 2012 Olympic bronze medalist. He also held the world title in 2009 and 2015 and European title in 2012, 2014 and 2016. His most notable achievements in a club competition are the LEN Euroleague and the LEN Supercup which he won in 2011 with Partizan Raiffeisen.

Club career

Partizan Raiffeisen
On 22 October 2011 Aleksić scored a goal in the first round of the Euroleague Group, in an 8–9 loss to Szeged Beton VE. On 9 November Aleksić scored his second goal of the tournament in the second round of the Euroleague Group in the 10–10 tie against TEVA-Vasas-UNIQA. On 26 November Aleksić scored his third goal of the tournament in a 9–6 Euroleague third round win over ZF Eger in Belgrade. Aleksić scored two goals on 14 December in the fourth round of the Euroleague, in the 12–8 second defeat to ZF Eger. On 8 February Milan Aleksić scored two goals for Partizan in the fifth round of the Euroleague Group in which his team won without much problem 9–5 against TEVA-Vasas-UNIQA. On 26 February Aleksić scored his last goal in the final round of the Euroleague Group, in which his team lost by 9–8 to Szeged Beton VE and dropped out of the competition. On 1 March he scored a goal against VK Vojvodina in a 10–9 win in the "A League" fourth round.

National career
Aleksić scored his first goal at the European Championship on 17 January 2012 against Germany in Serbia's second game which the Serbs won by 13–12. On 19 January 2012, in their third game of the tournament, Aleksić scored his second goal in a difficult 15–12 victory against the defending European champions, Croatia.

100th match for the Serbia national team
On 23 January, Aleksić played his 100th official match for his national team in the last round of group A scoring a goal, in which Serbia lost to Montenegro with 11–7.

On 27 January Aleksić scored two goals in a semifinal 12–8 victory over Italy. Milan Aleksić won the 2012 European Championship with Serbia on 29 January. He scored a goal in the final against Montenegro which his national team won by 9–8. This was his first gold medal at the European Championships.

At the 2012 Summer Olympics, Aleksić was part of the Serbian team that won the bronze medal.

At the 2016 Summer Olympics, Aleksić was part of the Serbian team that won the gold medal.

At the 2020 Summer Olympics, Aleksić was part of the Serbian team that won the gold medal.

Honours

Club
VK Partizan
LEN Champions League: 2010–11
Serbian Chanmpionship: 2006–07, 2007–08, 2008–09, 2009–10, 2010–11
Serbian Cup: 2006–07, 2007–08, 2008–09, 2009–10, 2010–11, 2011–12
LEN Super Cup: 2011
Eurointer League : 2010, 2011
Szolnok
LEN Champions League: 2016–17
LEN Super Cup: 2017
Hungarian Championship: 2014–15, 2015–16, 2016–17
Hungarian Cup: 2014, 2016, 2017
Hungarian Super Cup: 2016, 2017
CN Atlètic-Barceloneta
Spanish Championship: 2019–20, 2020–21
Copa del Rey: 2019–20, 2020–21

See also
 Serbia men's Olympic water polo team records and statistics
 List of Olympic champions in men's water polo
 List of Olympic medalists in water polo (men)
 List of world champions in men's water polo
 List of World Aquatics Championships medalists in water polo

References

External links

 
 Milan Aleksić at Water Polo Association of Serbia (archived)
 

1986 births
Living people
Sportspeople from Belgrade
Serbian male water polo players
Water polo centre backs
Water polo players at the 2012 Summer Olympics
Water polo players at the 2016 Summer Olympics
Water polo players at the 2020 Summer Olympics
Medalists at the 2012 Summer Olympics
Medalists at the 2016 Summer Olympics
Medalists at the 2020 Summer Olympics
Olympic gold medalists for Serbia in water polo
Olympic bronze medalists for Serbia in water polo
World Aquatics Championships medalists in water polo
European champions for Serbia
Competitors at the 2009 Mediterranean Games
Competitors at the 2018 Mediterranean Games
Mediterranean Games medalists in water polo
Mediterranean Games gold medalists for Serbia
Universiade medalists in water polo
Universiade gold medalists for Serbia and Montenegro
Serbian expatriate sportspeople in Hungary